Araba Euskaraz is the festivity that ikastola-s (schools in which Basque is the language of instruction) of Álava celebrate. The Ikastola-s' Association organizes it annually in mid-June, and it was first organized in 1981 in Vitoria, capital of Álava.

Every year it is celebrate it in a different place by a different ikastola, with the aim of promote the use of Euskara in Álava, as well as helping to collect money to improve the infrastructures of the ikastola-s.

The celebration is organized around a circuit, where you are involve in certain activities that are aimed at the general public (concerts, performers, etc.). Different music groups get together this day to make a memorable and entertaining festival.

In 2015, it celebrated the 45th edition, which took place on June 14 under the theme "Piztu Euskara" and the logo of a bulb, an invitation to "turn on" the use of the Basque language. It has been decided to organize it in the capital mainly for economic reasons.

All editions
 1981 - Olarizu, Gasteiz (Theme: Araba Zazpi talde-bat euskararen alde). 
 1982 - Mendizorrotza, Gasteiz (Theme: Irakaskuntza publikoa: Euskara denontzat). 
 1983 - Laudio. 
 1984 - Oion. 
 1985 - Agurain. 
 1986 - Amurrio (Theme: Araban bultza euskararen martxa). 
 1987 - Kanpezu. 
 1988 - Izarra (Theme: Lurra goldatu, euskara loratu). 
 1989 - Bastida. 
 1990 - Abetxuku (Theme: Ikastolan arin arin, euskara zabal dadin). 
 1991 - Armentia, Gasteiz (Theme: Euskara bizia; ikastola, hazia). 
 1992 - Armentia, Gasteiz (Theme: Ikastolan geurea lantzen). 
 1993 - Laudio (Theme: Etorkizuna euskaraz!). 
 1994 - Lapuebla Labarka (Theme: Non eta mugan ). 
 1995 - Gasteiz (Theme: Baietz atera!). 
 1996 - Amurrio (Theme: Euskara guztiona). 
 1997 - Oion (Theme: Gorabidean). 
 1998 - Araia-Zalduondo (Theme: Orain dugu garaia). 
 1999 - Lapuebla Labarka (Theme: Uztaz uzta, alez ale). 
 2000 - Laudio (Theme: Txikia zainduz handitu). 
 2001 - Argantzun (Theme: Hazteko erein). 
 2002 - Zigoitia (Theme: Gure erronka). 
 2003 - Oion (Theme: Oro bil borobil). 
 2004 - Bastida (Theme: Uzta hartu, uztartuaz). 
 2005 - Amurrio (Theme: Ekiozu bideari). 
 2006 - Armentia, Gasteiz (Theme: Barruan daramagu). 
 2007 - Argantzun (Theme: Garenaren jostun). 
 2008 - Bastida (Theme: Ametsak dirau). 
 2009 - Oion (Theme: Hauspoari eraginez). 
 2010 - Agurain (Theme: Gogo biziz). 
 2011 - Laudio (Theme: Izan zirelako gara, garelako izango dira). 
 2012 - Bastida (Theme: Barneratu, Barreiatu). 
 2013 - Amurrio (Theme: Mihian kili-kili, euskaraz ibili). 
 2014 - Lapuebla de Labarca (Theme: Mugan Bizi, Bizi). 
 2015 - Armentia, Gasteiz (Organized by Oiongo ikastola; theme: Piztu euskara).
 2016 - Agurain, (Organized by Lautada ikastola; theme: Geroari begira).

Other similar celebrations
Herri Urrats(Place: Ipar Euskal Herria).
Ibilaldia (Place: Bizkaia).
Kilometroak (Place: Gipuzkoa).
Nafarroa Oinez (Place: Nafarroa).

References

External links

1981 establishments in Spain
Álava
Basque culture
Festivals in Spain
Recurring events established in 1981
Basque festivals
Summer events in Spain